Wayne Wright may refer to:

 Wayne D. Wright (1916–2003), American Hall of Fame and National Champion Thoroughbred horse racing jockey
 Wayne P. Wright (born 1951), tenth bishop of the Episcopal Diocese of Delaware from 1998 to 2017